Ted Jensen (born September 19, 1954) is an American mastering engineer who, among others, has mastered the Eagles' Hotel California, Green Day's American Idiot and Norah Jones' Come Away with Me.

Selected works
Ted Jensen started working making tape copies at Sterling Sound in 1976. Soon after, he became an apprentice to owner Lee Hulko and mastering engineer, George Marino, taking over much of Hulko's mastering workload while Hulko focused more on management duties. In his first year at Sterling Sound, Jensen mastered the Eagles album, Hotel California and the Climax Blues Band's Gold Plated. The following year, Jensen mastered Billy Joel's The Stranger, Rod Stewart's Foot Loose & Fancy Free, Cat Stevens' Izitso and Bob Marley & The Wailers' Exodus. In the last 45 years, Ted Jensen has mastered thousands of albums for thousands of pop and rock artists.

1970s–1980s

 1976  Gold Plated - Climax Blues Band
 1976  Happy Being Lonely - The Chi-Lites
 1976  Hotel California - Eagles
 1976  Majesty Music - Miroslav Vitouš
 1976  Renaissance - Lonnie Liston Smith and the Cosmic Echoes
 1976  Underwater Electronic Orchestra - Jean-Yves Labat
 1977  A Fantasy Love Affair - Peter Brown
 1977  Exodus - Bob Marley and the Wailers
 1977  Fandango - Fandango
 1977  Foot Loose & Fancy Free - Rod Stewart
 1977  I Came to Dance - Nils Lofgren
 1977  I Robot - The Alan Parsons Project
 1977  Izitso - Cat Stevens
 1977  One of a Kind - Dave Grusin
 1977  Rhapsody in Blue - Walter Murphy
 1977  Songwriter - Justin Hayward
 1977  Stage Pass - Michael Stanley Band
 1977  The Hardness of the World - Slave
 1977  The Stranger - Billy Joel
 1977  What a Wonderful World - Johnny Nash
 1977  Young Loud and Snotty - The Dead Boys
 1978  52nd Street – Billy Joel
 1978  Angie - Angela Bofill
 1978  Babylon by Bus - Bob Marley and the Wailers
 1978  But Seriously, Folks... - Joe Walsh
 1978  Cecil Taylor Unit - Cecil Taylor
 1978  Deadlines - Strawbs
 1978  Get Out - Foxy
 1978  Heaven Help the Fool - Bob Weir
 1978  Hot Streets - Chicago
 1978  Kaya - Bob Marley and the Wailers
 1978  Legends - Dave Valentin
 1978  Live: Take No Prisoners - Lou Reed
 1978  Live at Carnegie Hall: 40th Anniversary Concert - Benny Goodman
 1978  Octave - The Moody Blues
 1978  Pieces of Eight - Styx
 1978  Ross - Diana Ross
 1978  Some Girls – The Rolling Stones
 1978  Street Hassle - Lou Reed
 1978  Shakedown Street - Grateful Dead
 1978  The Best of Joe Walsh - Joe Walsh
 1978  Urban Desire - Genya Ravan
 1978  You Ain't No Friend of Mine! - Idris Muhammad
 1979  Carolyne Mas – Carolyne Mas
 1979  Chicago 13 - Chicago
 1979  Cornerstone - Styx
 1979  Mountain Dance - Dave Grusin
 1979  Partners in Crime - Rupert Holmes
 1979  Rogue Waves - Terry Reid
 1979  Survival - Bob Marley and the Wailers
 1979  The B-52's - The B-52's
 1979  The Bells - Lou Reed
 1979  The Long Run - Eagles
 1979  Three Works for Jazz Soloists and Symphony Orchestra - Don Sebesky
 1979  What Cha' Gonna Do with My Lovin' - Stephanie Mills
 1980  Clues - Robert Palmer
 1980  Eagles Live - Eagles
 1980  Emotional Rescue - The Rolling Stones
 1980  Empty Glass - Pete Townshend
 1980  Face to Face - Rick Derringer
 1980  Glass Houses - Billy Joel
 1980  One-Trick Pony - Paul Simon
 1980  Uprising - Bob Marley and the Wailers
 1980  Warm Leatherette - Grace Jones
 1980  White Music - Crack the Sky
 1980  Winelight - Grover Washington Jr.
 1981  'Nard - Bernard Wright
 1981  Dirty Deeds Done Dirt Cheap - AC/DC
 1981  Face Dances - The Who
 1981  Get Wet - Get Wet
 1981  Ghost in the Machine – The Police
 1981  Metal Priestess - Plasmatics
 1981  Music from "The Elder" - Kiss
 1981  Nightclubbing - Grace Jones
 1981  Paradise Theater - Styx
 1981  Songs in the Attic - Billy Joel
 1981  Why Do Fools Fall in Love - Diana Ross
 1982  All the Best Cowboys Have Chinese Eyes - Pete Townshend
 1982  Bill Wyman - Bill Wyman
 1982  Cardiac Party - Jack Mack & The Heart Attack
 1982  Don Blackman - Don Blackman
 1982  Living My Life- Grace Jones
 1982  Out of the Shadows - Dave Grusin
 1982  Records - Foreigner
 1982  Shangó - Santana
 1982  Sheffield Steel - Joe Cocker
 1982  Silk Electric Diana Ross
 1982  The Nylon Curtain - Billy Joel
 1983  An Innocent Man - Billy Joel
 1983  Clics modernos - Charly García
 1983  "Weird Al" Yankovic – "Weird Al" Yankovic
 1983  Confrontation - Bob Marley and the Wailers
 1983  Kilroy Was Here - Styx
 1983  Love Over and Over- Kate McGarrigle & Anna McGarrigle
 1983  Madonna - Madonna

 1983  Night Lines - Dave Grusin
 1983  Speaking in Tongues – Talking Heads
 1983  Sports Huey Lewis and the News
 1983  Such Is Love - Peter, Paul and Mary
 1983  Whammy! - The B-52's
 1983  You Bought It – You Name It - Joe Walsh
 1984  20/20 - George Benson
 1984  Agent Provocateur- Foreigner
 1984  Caught in the Act - Styx
 1984  Christine McVie - Christine McVie
 1984  Dave Grusin and the NY-LA Dream Band - Dave Grusin
 1984  Desert Moon - Dennis DeYoung
 1984  Earth Crisis - Steel Pulse
 1984  Home Again - Judy Collins
 1984  Legend - Bob Marley and the Wailers
 1984  Stop Making Sense - Talking Heads
 1984  Swept Away - Diana Ross
 1984  Valotte - Julian Lennon
 1985  20/20 - George Benson
 1985  Deedles - Diane Schuur	 
 1985  Gettin' Away with Murder - Patti Austin 
 1985  Invasion of Your Privacy - Ratt
 1985  Lyle Mays - Lyle Mays
 1985  Spoiled Girl- Carly Simon 
 1985  That's Why I'm Here - James Taylor
 1986  Back in the High Life – Steve Winwood
 1986  Beyond the Pale - Fiona
 1986  City Slicker - James Young
 1986  Desire Caught by the Tail - Adrian Belew	 
 1986  Fame and Fortune - Bad Company
 1986  Fore! - Huey Lewis and the News
 1986  Powerplay -Billy Cobham	 
 1986  Rebel Music - Bob Marley and the Wailers	 
 1986  The Big Picture - Michael W. Smith	 
 1986  The Bridge - Billy Joel	 
 1986  The Secret Value of Daydreaming - Julian Lennon	 
 1986  Third Degree - Johnny Winter 
 1986  True Blue - Madonna
 1987  Cinemagic - Dave Grusin	
 1987  Coming Around Again - Carly Simon
 1987  Crazy Nights - Kiss	
 1987  Grappelli Plays Jerome Kern - Stéphane Grappelli 
 1987  Inside Information - Foreigner	
 1987  Kontsert - Billy Joel
 1987  Love Is for Suckers - Twisted Sister
 1987  Men and Women - Simply Red	
 1987  No Pain for Cakes - The Lounge Lizards	
 1987  Picture This - Billy Cobham	
 1987  Pleased to Meet Me - The Replacements
 1987  Trust Your Heart - Judy Collins
 1988  Knock Dem Dead - Arrow
 1988  Peter & The Wolf / Carnival Of The Animals - Part II - "Weird Al" Yankovic, Wendy Carlos
 1989  O'La Soca - Arrow
 1990  Soca Dance Party - Arrow
 1988  Big Thing - Duran Duran
 1988  CK - Chaka Khan
 1988  Ivory Coast - Bob James
 1988  Live at the Blue Note - Dave Valentin
 1988  My Guitar Wants to Kill Your Mama  - Dweezil Zappa 
 1988  No Easy Walk to Freedom - Peter, Paul and Mary
 1988  Roll with It - Steve Winwood	
 1988  State of Emergency - Steel Pulse	
 1988  The Carrack Collection - Paul Carrack
 1988  Underneath the Radar - Underworld
 1989  Heart Like a Gun - Fiona
 1989  Journeyman - Eric Clapton
 1989  Powerful Stuff - The Fabulous Thunderbirds	
 1989  Save Yourself - McAuley Schenker Group	
 1989  Steel Wheels - The Rolling Stones
 1989  Storm Front - Billy Joel
 1989  Trouble Walkin'- Ace Frehley
 1989  Waiting for Spring - David Benoit

1990s–2000s

 1990  Cherry Pie - Warrant
 1990  Edge of the Century - Styx	
 1990  Fast Forward - Spyro Gyra
 1990  Feeding Frenzy: Jimmy Buffett Live! - Jimmy Buffett
 1990  Grand Piano Canyon - Bob James
 1990  Have You Seen Me Lately - Carly Simon
 1990  Hearts and Flowers - Joan Armatrading
 1990  Liberty - Duran Duran
 1990  Light Struck - Dave Valentin
 1990  Reference Point - Acoustic Alchemy
 1990  Refugees of the Heart- Steve Winwood
 1990  The Earth, a Small Man, His Dog and a Chicken - REO Speedwagon
 1990  The Immaculate Collection - Madonna
 1991	Back on the Case - Acoustic Alchemy
 1991	Backlash - Bad English
 1991	Dark Sneak Love Action - Tom Tom Club
 1991  LaTour - LaTour
 1991  Live at the Apollo - B.B. King
 1991	Live at the Hollywood Palladium, December 15, 1988 - Keith Richards and the X-Pensive Winos
 1991	Music for the People - Marky Mark and the Funky Bunch
 1991  Mental Jewelry – Live
 1991	Musical Portraits - Dave Valentin
 1991	Pocket Full of Kryptonite - Spin Doctors
 1991	Pure Schuur - Diane Schuur
 1991	Real Life - Simple Minds 
 1991	Road Apples - The Tragically Hip 
 1991	Talkin' Blues - Bob Marley and the Wailers
 1991	The Prodigal Stranger - Procol Harum
 1991	Unusual Heat - Foreigner 
 1991	Walk That Walk, Talk That Talk - The Fabulous Thunderbirds 
 1991	Word of Mouth - Mike + The Mechanics	 
 1992	Doo-Bop - Miles Davis
 1992	Early Alchemy - Acoustic Alchemy
 1992	Erotica - Madonna
 1992	Fictionary - Lyle Mays
 1992	Flowers and Stones - Peter, Paul and Mary
 1992	GRP All-Star Big Band - GRP All-Star Big Band
 1992	Homebelly Groove...Live	- Spin Doctors
 1992	Images and Words - Dream Theater
 1992  Secret Story - Pat Metheny
 1992	Songs for a Dying Planet - Joe Walsh
 1992  Soul of a New Machine - Fear Factory
 1992	Strange Weather - Glenn Frey
 1992  Unplugged – Eric Clapton *Grammy Winner Album of the Year
 1993	Blink of an Eye - Michael McDonald
 1993  Duets – Frank Sinatra
 1993	Harbor Lights - Bruce Hornsby
 1993	Live at the Marquee - Dream Theater
 1993	Memorial Beach - A-ha
 1993	Mexican Moon - Concrete Blonde
 1993	No Cure for Cancer - Denis Leary
 1993	Peter, Paul & Mommy, Too - Peter, Paul and Mary
 1993	River of Dreams - Billy Joel
 1993	Romulus Hunt: A Family Opera - Carly Simon
 1993	The Rainy Season - Marc Cohn
 1993	The Road to You - Pat Metheny
 1993	What You Hear Is What You Get: The Best of Bad Company - Bad Company
 1994	10 on Broadway - Dennis DeYoung
 1994	Awake - Dream Theater
 1994	Duets II - Frank Sinatra
 1994	Excuses for Bad Begavior (Part One) - Sandra Bernhard
 1994  Far Beyond Driven - Pantera
 1994  Freak City Soundtrack - Material Issue
 1994	From the Cradle - Eric Clapton
 1994 	Fruitcakes	- Jimmy Buffett
 1994	Going Back Home - Ginger Baker
 1994  Groove On - Gerald Levert
 1994  Hell Freezes Over – Eagles
 1994	Naveed - Our Lady Peace
 1994 	Night Music - Joe Jackson
 1994	Letters Never Sent - Carly Simon
 1994  The Mind's Eye - Stiltskin
 1994  Throwing Copper – Live
 1994	To the Bone - The Kinks
 1994	Turn It Upside Down - Spin Doctors
 1994  Under the Table and Dreaming – Dave Matthews Band
 1995	A Boy Named Goo - Goo Goo Dolls
 1995	A Change of Seasons - Dream Theater
 1995	Adrenaline - Deftones
 1995  Astro-Creep: 2000 – Songs of Love, Destruction and Other Synthetic Delusions of the Electric Head - White Zombie
 1995	Barometer Soup - Jimmy Buffett
 1995	Damaged Goods - Nils Lofgren
 1995  Demanufacture - Fear Factory
 1995  Frogstomp - Silverchair
 1995  It's Great When You're Straight...Yeah - Black Grape
 1995  Life Begins at 40 Million - The Bogmen
 1995	Love and Other Obsessions - Spyro Gyra
 1995  Mint 400 - Ammonia
 1995	Mr. Moonlight - Foreigner
 1995	Naked Songs – Live and Acoustic - Rickie Lee Jones
 1995	Natural Mystic: The Legend Lives On - Bob Marley and the Wailers
 1995	One Clear Voice - Peter Cetera
 1995	Plumb - Jonatha Brooke and The Story
 1995	Sinatra 80th: Live in Concert - Frank Sinatra
 1995	Tails - Lisa Loeb
 1995	Tambu - Toto
 1995	Vaughan Williams: Fantasia on a theme by Thomas Tallis; Symphony No. 5; Previn: Reflections
 1995 	We Live Here - Pat Metheny Group
 1996	A Place in the World - Mary Chapin Carpenter
 1996	Banana Wind - Jimmy Buffett	
 1996	Beyond the Missouri Sky (Short Stories) - Pat Metheny and Charlie Haden
 1996	Crash - Dave Matthews Band 
 1996	Mortal City - Dar Williams
 1996  Neurotic Outsiders - Neurotic Outsiders
 1996  No Talking, Just Head - The Heads
 1996	Quartet - Pat Metheny
 1996  Remember - Rusted Root
 1996	The Great Southern Trendkill - Pantera	
 1996	Tidal - Fiona Apple
 1996  Villains - The Verve Pipe
 1996	You've Got to Believe in Something - Spin Doctors
 1997  Aftertaste - Helmet
 1997  Around the Fur - Deftones
 1997  Beautiful World - Big Head Todd and the Monsters
 1997	Feelings - David Byrne
 1997  Firecracker - Lisa Loeb
 1997  Good Feeling - Travis
 1997	Heaven & Hell - Joe Jackson
 1997	Imaginary Day - Pat Metheny Group
 1997	Junction Seven - Steve Winwood
 1997  Middle of Nowhere - Hanson
 1997	Official Live: 101 Proof - Pantera	
 1997	Second-hand Smoke - Sublime
 1997  Secret Samadhi - Live
 1997  Snowed In - Hanson
 1997  Stuff - Holly McNarland
 1997  Stupid Stupid Stupid - Black Grape
 1997	The Dance - Fleetwood Mac
 1997	The More Things Change... - Machine Head
 1997  Third Eye Blind - Third Eye Blind
 1998	Before These Crowded Streets - Dave Matthews Band
 1998  Celebrity Skin - Hole
 1998	Mechanical Animals - Marilyn Manson
 1998  Obsolete - Fear Factory
 1998	Ray of Light - Madonna
 1998	Sketches for My Sweetheart the Drunk - Jeff Buckley
 1998  Soulfly - Soulfly
 1998  Sunburn - Fuel
 1998	The Water Garden - Alex De Grassi 
 1998	Up - R.E.M.
 1998  Visual Audio Sensory Theater - VAST
 1998	Whitechocolatespaceegg - Liz Phair
 1998	You Are Here - Steve Khan
 1999 	'Til the Medicine Takes - Widespread Panic 
 1999	A Map of the World - Pat Metheny
 1999  Anomie & Bonhomie - Scritti Politti
 1999	Brave New World - Styx
 1999  Buckcherry - Buckcherry
 1999  Dosage - Collective Soul
 1999  Everything You Want - Vertical Horizon
 1999  February Son - Oleander
 1999  First Love - Hikaru Utada
 1999	Here Comes the Bride - Spin Doctors
 1999	Human Clay - Creed
 1999	Lost and Gone Forever - Guster
 1999	Mindfields  - Toto
 1999  Nasty Little Thoughts - Stroke 9
 1999  Northern Star - Melanie C
 1999	Ricky Martin - Ricky Martin
 1999  Street Faërie - Cree Summer
 1999  Supernatural – Santana
 1999	The Burning Red - Machine Head
 1999  The Distance to Here - Live
 1999  The Last Tour on Earth - Marilyn Manson
 1999  Tight - Mindless Self Indulgence
 2000	Awake - Godsmack
 2000	Breach - The Wallflowers
 2000  Caviar - Caviar
 2000  Chore of Enchantment - Giant Sand
 2000  Comatised - Leona Naess
 2000  Everything You Ever Wanted to Know About Silence - Glassjaw
 2000	Good Charlotte - Good Charlotte
 2000  Gung Ho - Patti Smith
 2000	Here Come the Noise Makers - Bruce Hornsby
 2000  Horrorscope - Eve 6
 2000	Night and Day II - Joe Jackson
 2000  Now You See Inside - SR-71
 2000  Poem - Delerium
 2000	The Door - Keb' Mo'
 2000  The Greyest of Blue Skies - Finger Eleven
 2000  The Height of Callousness - Spineshank
 2000	Warning - Green Day

2000s–2010s

 2001	Bleed American - Jimmy Eat World
 2001	Cocky - Kid Rock
 2001	Don't Tell the Band - Widespread Panic
 2001	Irresistible - Jessica Simpson
 2001	J.Lo - Jennifer Lopez
 2001  Laundry Service - Shakira
 2001  Momentum - TobyMac
 2001	Rockin' the Suburbs - Ben Folds
 2001  Satellite - P.O.D.
 2001	Supercharger - Machine Head
 2001  The Anatomy of the Tongue in Cheek - Relient K
 2001  Underneath - The Verve Pipe
 2001	V - Live
 2001	What I Learned About Ego, Opinion, Art & Commerce - Goo Goo Dolls
 2002  3 - Soulfly
 2002  A Jackknife to a Swan - The Mighty Mighty Bosstones
 2002	Away from the Sun - 3 Doors Down
 2002  Babylon - Skindred
 2002	Ben Folds Live - Ben Folds 
 2002	Big Swing Face - Bruce Hornsby
 2002  Bitterness the Star - 36 Crazyfists
 2002	Bounce - Bon Jovi
 2002	Busted Stuff - Dave Matthews Band
 2002  Cake and Pie - Lisa Loeb
 2002	Come Away with Me - Norah Jones
 2002  Dark Days - Coal Chamber
 2002  Darkhorse - Crazy Town
 2002  Highly Evolved - The Vines
 2002	It Had to Be You: The Great American Songbook - Rod Stewart
 2002	October Road - James Taylor
 2002  OK Go - OK Go
 2002  Silence - Blindside
 2002	Speaking of Now - Pat Metheny Group
 2002  The Big Room - M2M
 2002  To Whom It May Concern - Splender
 2002  Tomorrow - SR-71
 2002  Trapt - Trapt
 2002	Waiting for My Rocket to Come - Jason Mraz
 2003	At Last - Cyndi Lauper
 2003  Birds of Pray - Live
 2003  Blackout - Hed PE
 2003  Chimera - Delerium
 2003  Confession - Ill Niño
 2003	Fallen - Evanescence
 2003  Flutterby - Butterfly Boucher
 2003	Ghosts - Sleeping at Last
 2003  Go - Vertical Horizon
 2003  Hatefiles - Fear Factory
 2003	In Between Now and Then	- O.A.R.
 2003  In Reverie - Saves the Day
 2003	Kid Rock - Kid Rock
 2003	Live at Budokan - Sheryl Crow
 2003	Liz Phair - Liz Phair
 2003  Ocean Avenue - Yellowcard
 2003  One Quiet Night - Pat Metheny

 2003	Rock n Roll - Ryan Adams 
 2003	Rules of Travel - Rosanne Cash
 2003  Self-Destructive Pattern - Spineshank
 2003	Some Devil - Dave Matthews
 2003	Speed Graphic - Ben Folds
 2003  Stop All the World Now - Howie Day
 2003  Thank You - Stone Temple Pilots
 2003	The Trouble with Being Myself - Macy Gray
 2003	Three Days Grace - Three Days Grace
 2003	To Whom It May Concern - Lisa Marie Presley
 2003  Two Angels and a Dream - Depswa
 2003  Two Lefts Don't Make a Right...but Three Do - Relient K
 2003  Year of the Spider - Cold
 2004  America's Sweetheart - Courtney Love
 2004  American Idiot - Green Day
 2004	Around the Sun - R.E.M.
 2004  Autobiography - Ashlee Simpson
 2004	Baptism - Lenny Kravitz
 2004  Barenaked for the Holidays - Barenaked Ladies
 2004	Catalyst - New Found Glory
 2004	Cool Morning - Sloan Wainwright
 2004	From a Basement on the Hill - Elliott Smith
 2004	Futures - Jimmy Eat World
 2004	Getting Away with Murder - Papa Roach
 2004	Halcyon Days - Bruce Hornsby
 2004	Has Been - William Shatner
 2004	Healing Rain - Michael W. Smith
 2004	Hopes and Fears - Keane
 2004	Love Is Hell - Ryan Adams
 2004  Mmhmm - Relient K
 2004  Our Shadows Will Remain - Joseph Arthur
 2004  Pawn Shoppe Heart - The Von Bondies
 2004  Prophecy - Soulfly
 2004  Seven Circles - The Tea Party
 2004  Show and Tell - Silvertide
 2004  Size Matters - Helmet
 2004  Speak - Lindsay Lohan
 2004	Super D - Ben Folds
 2004  Take It All Away - Ryan Cabrera
 2004	Take It from the Top - Bob James
 2004	The Capitol Albums, Volume 1 - The Beatles
 2004  The Crash of '47 - Atomship
 2004	The Dana Owens Album - Queen Latifah
 2004  The Sound of White - Missy Higgins
 2004  Trouble - Bonnie McKee
 2004  Up the Dose - Skrape
 2004  Vol. 3: (The Subliminal Verses) - Slipknot
 2004	Where You Want to Be - Taking Back Sunday
 2004  Who Killed...... The Zutons? - The Zutons
 2004  Winning Days - The Vines
 2005	15 - Buckcherry
 2005  Alex Lloyd - Alex Lloyd
 2005	All That I Am - Santana
 2005	All the Right Reasons - Nickelback
 2005  Apathetic EP - Relient K
 2005  Best of Soul - BoA
 2005  Broken Valley - Life of Agony
 2005	Bullet in a Bible - Green Day
 2005  Catch Without Arms - Dredg
 2005  Everything Is - Nine Black Alps
 2005	From the Ground Up - Antigone Rising
 2005	Gasoline - Theory of a Deadman
 2005  Hours - Funeral for a Friend
 2005	I Am Me- Ashlee Simpson
 2005	Lifehouse - Lifehouse
 2005	Lost and Found	- Mudvayne
 2005	Move Along - The All-American Rejects 
 2005	Mr. A-Z	- Jason Mraz
 2005	Nothing Is Sound - Switchfoot
 2005	Odditorium or Warlords of Mars - The Dandy Warhols
 2005  Odyssey - Fischerspooner
 2005  On the Outside - Starsailor
 2005	Possibilities - Herbie Hancock 
 2005	See You on the Other Side - Korn 
 2005	Somebody's Miracle - Liz Phair
 2005	Songs for Silverman - Ben Folds
 2005  Supernature - Goldfrapp
 2005  Takk... - Sigur Rós
 2005	Ten Thousand Fists - Disturbed
 2005	Thanks for the Memory: The Great American Songbook, Volume IV - Rod Stewart
 2005	The Way Up - Pat Metheny Group
 2005  The Weight Is a Gift - Nada Surf
 2005	Us and Them - Shinedown 
 2005	Winter Wonderland - Point of Grace 
 2005	Worlds Apart - ...And You Will Know Us by the Trail of Dead
 2006  4 - Gerling
 2006	A Death-Grip on Yesterday - Atreyu
 2006	A Decade - Our Lady Peace
 2006	As Daylight Dies - Killswitch Engage
 2006  Beautiful World - Take That
 2006  Black Cadillac – Rosanne Cash
 2006  Black Fingernails, Red Wine - Eskimo Joe
 2006  Black Stone Cherry - Black Stone Cherry
 2006	Chopped, Screwed, Live and Unglued - Korn
 2006  Come What(ever) May - Stone Sour
 2006	Coming Home - New Found Glory
 2006	Daughtry - Daughtry
 2006  Daylight - Needtobreathe
 2006	Decemberunderground - AFI
 2006	Don't You Fake It - The Red Jumpsuit Apparatus
 2006	Dusk and Summer - Dashboard Confessional
 2006  End of Silence - Red
 2006	Every Man for Himself - Hoobastank
 2006  Every Second Counts - Plain White T's
 2006	Full of Elevating Pleasures - Boom Boom Satellites
 2006	Ganging Up on the Sun - Guster
 2006	Goodbye Alice in Wonderland - Jewel
 2006	Let Love In - Goo Goo Dolls
 2006	Lights and Sounds - Yellowcard
 2006	Live Trucker - Kid Rock
 2006	Oh! Gravity. - Switchfoot
 2006	One-X - Three Days Grace
 2006  Phobia - Breaking Benjamin
 2006	Robbers & Cowards - Cold War Kids
 2006  Rock Star Supernova - Rock Star Supernova
 2006	Saosin - Saosin
 2006	Sleep Is the Enemy - Danko Jones
 2006  Songs from Black Mountain - Live
 2006  Still Searching - Senses Fail
 2006  Supremacy - Hatebreed
 2006	Ta-Dah - Scissor Sisters
 2006	Tears Don't Fall - Bullet for My Valentine
 2006	Testify	- P.O.D.
 2006	The Black Parade - My Chemical Romance
 2006	The Capitol Albums, Volume 2 - The Beatles
 2006	The Crusade - Trivium
 2006	The Open Door - Evanescence
 2006	The Paramour Sessions - Papa Roach
 2006	The Poison: Live at Brixton - Bullet for My Valentine
 2006  The Reckoning - Pillar
 2006	The Sufferer & the Witness - Rise Against
 2006  This New Day - Embrace
 2006	This Old Road - Kris Kristofferson
 2006	Till the Sun Turns Black - Ray LaMontagne
 2006  Tired of Hanging Around - The Zutons
 2006  True Self - SOiL
 2006	Under the Iron Sea - Keane
 2006  Until There's Nothing Left of Us - Kill Hannah
 2006  Up in the Attic - Alien Ant Farm
 2006  We Are Glitter - Goldfrapp
 2007  Alpha - Sevendust
 2007  Another Animal - Another Animal
 2007	Because of the Times - Kings of Leon
 2007  Calling the World - Rooney
 2007	Chase This Light - Jimmy Eat World
 2007  Cities - Anberlin
 2007  Consequence - The Crash Motive
 2007  Control - GoodBooks
 2007	Exposed - Boom Boom Satellites
 2007	Famous - Puddle of Mudd
 2007	Finding Beauty in Negative Spaces - Seether
 2007  Five Score and Seven Years Ago - Relient K
 2007	Good Morning Revival - Good Charlotte
 2007	Happiness Ltd. - Hot Hot Heat
 2007	Infinity on High - Fall Out Boy
 2007	It Won't Be Soon Before Long - Maroon 5
 2007	Jonas Brothers - Jonas Brothers
 2007  Let It Snow, Baby... Let It Reindeer - Relient K
 2007	Notes from the Past - Taking Back Sunday
 2007  One Man Band - James Taylor
 2007  Paper Walls - Yellowcard
 2007	Quartet - Pat Metheny
 2007	Red Harvest - Bloodsimple
 2007	Riot! - Paramore
 2007	Rock n Roll Jesus - Kid Rock
 2007	Runnin' Wild - Airbourne
 2007	Scream - Tokio Hotel
 2007	So Wrong, It's Right - All Time Low
 2007	Songs of Mass Destruction - Annie Lennox
 2007  The Diamond You - Taro Gold
 2007	Them vs. You vs. Me - Finger Eleven
 2007	This Moment - Steven Curtis Chapman
 2007	Underclass Hero - Sum 41
 2007	Vena Sera - Chevelle 
 2007	Venus Doom - HIM
 2007	Volta - Björk
 2007	Who We Are - Lifehouse
 2007	Wolves - Idiot Pilot
 2008	Agony & Irony - Alkaline Trio
 2008	All Hope Is Gone - Slipknot
 2008	Appeal to Reason - Rise Against
 2008	Bittersweet World - Ashlee Simpson
 2008	Chapter VII: Hope & Sorrow - Sevendust
 2008	Dark Horse - Nickelback
 2008  Death Magnetic - Metallica
 2008  Don't Forget - Demi Lovato
 2008	Duo - Richard Marx and Matt Scannell
 2008	Folie à Deux - Fall Out Boy
 2008	From First to Last - From First to Last
 2008	Heart Station - Hikaru Utada
 2008	Hello Love - Chris Tomlin
 2008	The Illusion of Progress - Staind
 2008	Indestructible - Disturbed
 2008	It Is Time for a Love Revolution - Lenny Kravitz
 2008	Last Night - Moby
 2008	Live in Phoenix	- Fall Out Boy	
 2008	Liverpool 8 - Ringo Starr	
 2008	Lost in the Sound of Separation	- Underoath
 2008  Low vs Diamond - Low vs Diamond
 2008	Never Too Loud - Danko Jones 
 2008	Satisfied - Taylor Dayne 
 2008	Scars & Souvenirs - Theory of a Deadman 
 2008	Scream Aim Fire	- Bullet for My Valentine 
 2008	Shogun - Trivium 
 2008	Simple Plan - Simple Plan 
 2008	Snacktime! - Barenaked Ladies
 2008  Take It to the Limit - Hinder
 2008	The Black Swan - Story of the Year
 2008  The Moon Under Water - Ryan Cabrera
 2008	The New Game - Mudvayne
 2008  The Script - The Script
 2008	The Sound of Madness - Shinedown
 2009	21st Century Breakdown - Green Day
 2009	A Fine Mess - Kate Voegele
 2009	Alter the Ending - Dashboard Confessional 
 2009	Artwork - The Used
 2009  Awake - Skillet
 2009	Believe - Orianthi
 2009  Big Whiskey & the GrooGrux King - Dave Matthews Band
 2009	Black Gives Way to Blue	- Alice in Chains 
 2009	Dear Agony - Breaking Benjamin
 2009	Evangelion - Behemoth
 2009	For Your Entertainment - Adam Lambert
 2009	For(n)ever - Hoobastank
 2009	Full Circle - Creed
 2009	Halestorm - Halestorm
 2009	Happy Hour - Uncle Kracker
 2009	Hello Hurricane - Switchfoot
 2009	Humanoid - Tokio Hotel
 2009	It's Blitz! - Yeah Yeah Yeahs	
 2009	Killswitch Engage - Killswitch Engage
 2009	Leave This Town - Daughtry
 2009	Lonely Road - The Red Jumpsuit Apparatus
 2009	Mean Everything to Nothing - Manchester Orchestra
 2009	Metamorphosis - Papa Roach
 2009	Mudvayne - Mudvayne
 2009	New Again - Taking Back Sunday
 2009	Night Castle - Trans-Siberian Orchestra
 2009	Not Without a Fight - New Found Glory	
 2009	Nothing Personal - All Time Low
 2009  Ocean Eyes - Owl City
 2009  One Hundred Years from Now - Dennis DeYoung
 2009  Picture Perfect - SOiL
 2009	Save Me, San Francisco - Train
 2009	Say Anything - Say Anything
 2009	Sci-Fi Crimes - Chevelle
 2009	The List - Rosanne Cash
 2009	The Resistance - Muse	
 2009	The Show Must Go - Hedley
 2009  Wait for Me - Moby

2010s to 2020

 2010  AB III - Alter Bridge
 2010  Alive - Ed Kowalczyk
 2010  All My Friends Are Here - Arif Mardin
 2010  All in Good Time - Barenaked Ladies
 2010  And If Our God Is for Us... - Chris Tomlin
 2010  Asylum - Disturbed
 2010  Audio Secrecy - Stone Sour
 2010  Believe (II) - Orianthi
 2010  Best of Tokio Hotel - Tokio Hotel
 2010  Cardiology - Good Charlotte
 2010  Cold Day Memory - Sevendust
 2010  Danger Days: The True Lives of the Fabulous Killjoys - My Chemical Romance
 2010  Diamond Eyes - Deftones
 2010  Fever - Bullet for My Valentine
 2010  Go - Jónsi
 2010  Guitar Heaven: The Greatest Guitar Classics of All Time - Santana
 2010  Hang Cool Teddy Bear - Meat Loaf
 2010  Hoodoo - Krokus
 2010  Infestation - Ratt
 2010  Invented - Jimmy Eat World
 2010  Kaleidoscope Heart - Sara Bareilles
 2010  Korn III: Remember Who You Are - Korn
 2010  Life Turns Electric - Finger Eleven
 2010  Live It Up - Lee DeWyze
 2010  Live from Freedom Hall - Lynyrd Skynyrd
 2010  MTV Unplugged - All Time Low
 2010  My Darkest Days - My Darkest Days
 2010  Nightmare - Avenged Sevenfold
 2010  No Apologies - Trapt
 2010  No Guts. No Glory. - Airbourne
 2010  Science & Faith - The Script
 2010  Screamworks: Love in Theory and Practice - HIM
 2010  Some Kind of Trouble - James Blunt
 2010  Stone Temple Pilots - Stone Temple Pilots
 2010  Tear the World Down - We Are the Fallen
 2010  The Constant - Story of the Year
 2010  The Incredible Machine - Sugarland
 2010  The Powerless Rise - As I Lay Dying
 2010  The Trouble with Angels - Filter
 2010  This Addiction - Alkaline Trio
 2010  Time for Annihilation: On the Record & On the Road - Papa Roach
 2010  Tonight - TobyMac
 2010  Vintage Vinos - Keith Richards
 2010  VOCAbuLarieS - Bobby McFerrin
 2010  What Separates Me from You - A Day to Remember
 2010  Wonderlustre - Skunk Anansie
 2010  Ø (Disambiguation) - Underoath
 2011  A Dramatic Turn of Events - Dream Theater
 2011  All Things Bright and Beautiful - Owl City
 2011  All You Need Is Now - Duran Duran
 2011  Awesome as Fuck - Green Day
 2011  Between the Devil & the Deep Blue Sea - Black Stone Cherry
 2011  Blessed - Lucinda Williams
 2011  Break the Spell - Daughtry
 2011  Call to Arms - Saxon 
 2011  Ceremonials - Florence and the Machine  **Grammy Nomination
 2011  Christmas in Diverse City - TobyMac
 2011  Decas - As I Lay Dying
 2011  Endgame - Rise Against
 2011  Evanescence - Evanescence
 2011  Dirty Work - All Time Low
 2011  Get Your Heart On! - Simple Plan
 2011  Everything Changes - Julian Lennon
 2011  Goodbye Lullaby - Avril Lavigne
 2011  In Waves - Trivium
 2011  In Your Dreams - Stevie Nicks
 2011  Inni - Sigur Rós
 2011  Live at Shea Stadium: The Concert - Billy Joel
 2011  Lovestrong - Christina Perri
 2011  Luna Sea - Luna Sea
 2011  Música + Alma + Sexo - Ricky Martin
 2011  Hats Off to the Bull - Chevelle
 2011  Hell in a Handbasket - Meat Loaf
 2011  Holding Onto Strings Better Left to Fray - Seether
 2011  How Great Is Our God: The Essential Collection - Chris Tomlin
 2011  Prisoner - The Jezabels
 2011  Regeneration: Volume I & II - Styx
 2011  Screaming Bloody Murder - Sum 41
 2011  Shallow Bay: The Best of Breaking Benjamin - Breaking Benjamin
 2011  Skynyrd Nation - Lynyrd Skynyrd
 2011  Something for the Pain - Redlight King
 2011  Songwriter - Paul Simon
 2011  Staind - Staind
 2011  Reanimate 2.0: The Covers EP - Halestorm
 2011  Th1rt3en - Megadeth
 2011  The Best Of... The Great American Songbook - Rod Stewart
 2011  The Big Roar - The Joy Formidable
 2011  The Bright Lights EP - Gary Clark, Jr.
 2011  The Essential Meat Loaf - Meat Loaf
 2011  The Hunter - Mastodon
 2011  The Hymn of a Broken Man - Times of Grace
 2011  The Lost Children - Disturbed
 2011  The Path of Totality - Korn
 2011  The Reckoning - Needtobreathe
 2011  The Sea of Memories - Bush
 2011  The Truth Is... - Theory of a Deadman
 2011  The Unforgiving - Within Temptation
 2011  Time of My Life - 3 Doors Down
 2011  Under Your Skin - Saliva
 2011  Vice Verses - Switchfoot
 2011  Vices and Virtues - Art of Dying
 2011  What's It All About - Pat Metheny
 2011  When You're Through Thinking, Say Yes - Yellowcard
 2011  White Collar Lies - Kopek
2011 ‘’Live Life Loud and Crazy Love" -Hawk Nelson
 2012  3 - The Script
 2012  Amaryllis - Shinedown
 2012  America America - BeBe Winans
 2012  Antennas to Hell - Slipknot
 2012  Awakened - As I Lay Dying
 2012  Away from the World - Dave Matthews Band
 2012  Black Traffic - Skunk Anansie
 2012  Blak and Blu - Gary Clark, Jr.
 2012  Christmas Gift Pack - Chris Tomlin
 2012  Collide with the Sky - Pierce the Veil
 2012  Days Go By - The Offspring
 2012  Dead Silence - Billy Talent
 2012  Don't Panic - All Time Low
 2012  Dreams of Fireflies (On a Christmas Night) - Trans-Siberian Orchestra
 2012  Into the Light - Matthew West **Grammy Nomination
 2012  Fire It Up - Joe Cocker
 2012  King Animal - Soundgarden
 2012  Koi No Yokan - Deftones
 2012  Last Parade - Call Me No One
 2012  Last of a Dyin' Breed - Lynyrd Skynyrd
 2012  Barefoot at the Symphony Tour - Idina Menzel
 2012  Out of the Game - Rufus Wainwright
 2012  Phantom Antichrist - Kreator
 2012  North - Matchbox Twenty
 2012  Songs for the End of the World - Rick Springfield
 2012  Southern Air - Yellowcard
 2012  The Duke - Joe Jackson
 2012  The Midsummer Station - Owl City
 2012  The Orchestrion Project - Pat Metheny
 2012  The Strange Case Of... - Halestorm
 2012  Traveller - Jerry Douglas
 2012  Unity Band - Pat Metheny
 2012  Valtari - Sigur Rós
 2012 Where I find You - Kari Jobe  **Grammy Nomination
 2012  The 2nd Law - Muse
 2012  ¡Dos! - Green Day
 2012  ¡Tré! - Green Day
 2012  ¡Uno! - Green Day
 2012  Generation Freakshow - Feeder
 2013  8:18 - The Devil Wears Prada
 2013  A Life by Design? - Fight or Flight
 2013  All That Echoes - Josh Groban
 2013  All This for a King: The Essential Collection - David Crowder Band
 2013  BE - Beady Eye
 2013  Black Dog Barking - Airbourne
 2013  Black Out the Sun - Sevendust
 2013  Bookmarks - Five for Fighting
 2013  Breach - The Kissaway Trail
 2013  Burning Lights - Chris Tomlin  **Grammy Nomination
 2013  Christmas Gift Pack - Jeremy Camp
 2013  Common Courtesy - A Day to Remember
 2013  Damage - Jimmy Eat World
 2013  Device - Device
 2013  Dream Theater - Dream Theater
 2013  Echoes from the Underground - Vertical Horizon
 2013  Exile - Hurts
 2013  Face the Music - Marianas Trench
 2013  Fashionably Late - Falling in Reverse
 2013  Feel - Sleeping with Sirens
 2013  Fortress - Alter Bridge
 2013  From Death to Destiny - Asking Alexandria
 2013  Fuse - Keith Urban
 2013  Golden - Lady Antebellum
 2013  Hail Mary - Dark New Day
 2013  If the River Was Whiskey - Spin Doctors
 2013  If You Have Ghost - Ghost B.C.
 2013  Infestissumam - Ghost B.C.
 2013  Kveikur - Sigur Rós
 2013   Lastima Que Sean Ajenas - Pepe Aguilar **Grammy Nomination
 2013  Live at Rome Olympic Stadium - Muse
 2013  Locked & Loaded - Eve To Adam
 2013  Long Forgotten Songs: B-Sides & Covers 2000–2013 - Rise Against
 2013  Lucky Numbers - Dave Stewart
 2013  Magnetic - Goo Goo Dolls
 2013  Mechanical Bull - Kings of Leon  **Grammy Nomination
 2013  New – Paul McCartney
 2013  Opposites - Biffy Clyro
 2013  Paramore - Paramore
 2013  Pepper - Pepper
 2013  Prográmaton - Zoé
 2013  Proof of Life - Scott Stapp
 2013  Reflektor – Arcade Fire **Grammy Nomination
 2013  Release the Panic - Red
 2013  Reveal the Change - Silent Voices
 2013  The Revelation - Coldrain
 2013  Rise - Skillet
 2013  Savages - Soulfly
 2013  Say the Words - Wanting Qu
 2013  Seether: 2002-2013 - Seether
 2013  Sempiternal – Bring Me the Horizon
 2013  Spirityouall - Bobby McFerrin
 2013  Stairway to Hell - Ugly Kid Joe
 2013  Super Collider - Megadeth
 2013  Tap: Book of Angels Volume 20 - Pat Metheny
 2013  Tears on Tape - HIM
 2013  Temper Temper - Bullet for My Valentine
 2013  The Catalyst Fire - Dead Letter Circus
 2013  The Complete Album Collection - Paul Simon
 2013  The Devil Put Dinosaurs Here - Alice in Chains **Grammy Nomination
 2013  The Dream Calls for Blood - Death Angel
 2013  The Flood and the Mercy - Ed Kowalczyk
 2013  The Sun Comes Out Tonight - Filter
 2013  This World Won't Last Forever, But Tonight We Can Pretend - Matt Hires
 2013  To Be Loved - Michael Bublé
 2013  Too Weird to Live, Too Rare to Die! - Panic! at the Disco
 2013  Triumph and Power - Grand Magus
 2013  Tug of War - Red Line Chemistry
 2013  Two Lanes of Freedom - Tim McGraw  **Grammy Nomination
 2013  Vengeance Falls - Trivium
 2013  We as Human - We as Human
 2013  What About Now - Bon Jovi
 2013  Wild Life - Hedley
 2013  Wrong Guy (I Did It This Time) - Whitney Wolanin
 2013  Your Grace Finds Me - Matt Redman
 2013  Zigaexperientia - Supercell
 2014  5 Seconds of Summer - 5 Seconds of Summer
 2014  747 - Lady Antebellum
 2014  A Matter of Trust: The Bridge to Russia - Billy Joel
 2014  Agua Maldita - Molotov
 2014  Behind the Light - Phillip Phillips
 2014  Between the Stars - Flyleaf
 2014  Black Veil Brides - Black Veil Brides
 2014  Bloodstone & Diamonds - Machine Head
 2014  Bloodsuckers - VAMPS
 2014  Broken Compass - Sleepwave
 2014  Bulletproof Picasso - Train
 2014  Cavalier Youth - You Me at Six
 2014  Dear Youth - The Ghost Inside
 2014  Disgusting - Beartooth
 2014  Doom Abuse - The Faint
 2014  Everything Will Be Alright in the End - Weezer
 2014  Fading West  - Switchfoot
 2014  From the Spark - Grizfolk
 2014  Ghost Stories  - Coldplay **Grammy Nomination
 2014  Ghost Stories Live 2014 - Coldplay
 2014  Glory - Kutless
 2014  Going to Hell - The Pretty Reckless
 2014  Gord Downie, The Sadies, and the Conquering Sun - The Sadies
 2014  High Priestess - Kobra and the Lotus
 2014  Hits - Billy Talent
 2014  Hydra - Within Temptation
 2014  I Never Learn - Lykke Li
 2014  Isolate and Medicate - Seether
 2014  Kin - Pat Metheny
 2014  Let's Go Extinct - Fanfarlo
 2014  Lift a Sail - Yellowcard
 2014  Magic Mountain - Black Stone Cherry
 2014  Man on the Run - Bush
 2014  May Death Never Stop You - My Chemical Romance
 2014  Memoirs of a Murderer - King 810
 2014  Agua Maldita - Molotov **Grammy Nomination
 2014  Mind over Matter - Young the Giant
 2014  No Fixed Address - Nickelback
 2014  No Sound Without Silence - The Script
 2014  Once More 'Round the Sun - Mastodon
 2014  Our Endless War - Whitechapel
 2014  Pop Psychology - Neon Trees
 2014  Reincarnate - Motionless in White
 2014  Restoring Force/Full Circle - Of Mice & Men
 2014  Rise Up - Saliva
 2014  Rise of the Lion - Miss May I
 2014  Run Wild. Live Free. Love Strong. - For King & Country
 2014  Savages - Theory of a Deadman
 2014  A Song in My Head - The String Cheese Incident
 2014  Stuck - Adelitas Way
 2014  Teeth Dreams - The Hold Steady
 2014  The Beauty of Destruction - Devil You Know
 2014  The Black Market - Rise Against
 2014  The Human Contradiction - Delain
 2014  The Satanist - Behemoth
 2014  The Turn - Live
 2014  Very Good Bad Thing - Mother Mother
 2014  World on Fire - Slash featuring Myles Kennedy and The Conspirators
 2014  Wovenwar - Wovenwar
 2014  You Owe Nothing - Kill It Kid
 2015 35xxxv - One Ok Rock
 2015 Aesthesis - Dead Letter Circus
 2015 Around the World and Back - State Champs
 2015 Being as an Ocean - Being as an Ocean
 2015  9 - Negrita
 2015  Angel EP - Theory of a Deadman
 2015  Before This World - James Taylor **Grammy Nomination
 2015  Cauterize - Tremonti
 2015  Dark Before Dawn - Breaking Benjamin
 2015  Day of the Dead - Hollywood Undead
 2015  Dogma - the GazettE
 2015  Eclipse - Twin Shadow
 2015  Fast Forward - Joe Jackson
 2015  First Kiss - Kid Rock
 2015  Future Hearts - All Time Low
 2015  Holy War - Thy Art Is Murder
 2015  How Big, How Blue, How Beautiful - Florence + the Machine  **Grammy Nomination
 2015  I Cant Stop - BoDeans
 2015  I Will Follow - Jeremy Camp
 2015  Immortalized - Disturbed
 2015  Ire - Parkway Drive
 2015  Live at Budokan: Red Night - Babymetal
 2015  Locura Total - Fito Páez
 2015  Madness - Sleeping with Sirens
 2015  Metal Allegiance - Metal Allegiance
 2015  Michael Ray – Michael Ray
 2015  Mickey Guyton EP  – Mickey Guyton
 2015  Mobile Orchestra - Owl City
 2015  Need to Know - Priory
 2015  Out of the Wasteland - Lifehouse
 2015  Paper Gods - Duran Duran
 2015  Payola - Desaparecidos
 2015  Rise Up - Art of Dying
 2015  Saint Asonia - Saint Asonia
 2015  Space - The Devil Wears Prada
 2015  That's the Spirit - Bring Me the Horizon
 2015  The Color Before the Sun - Coheed & Cambria
 2015  Threat to Survival - Shinedown
 2015  Three - Gloriana
 2015  Uglier Than They Used ta Be - Ugly Kid Joe
 2015  Under One Sky - The Tenors
 2015  Vena - Coldrain
 2015  Venom - Bullet for My Valentine
 2015  Venus - Joy Williams
 2015  Walls - Gateway Worship
 2015  We Will Not Be Shaken (Live) - Bethel Music
 2015  When the Morning Comes - A Great Big World
 2015  + -  - Mew
 2016  13 Voices - Sum 41
 2016  Adore: Christmas Songs of Worship - Chris Tomlin
 2016 Afraid Of Heights - Billy Talent
 2016  Anarchytecture - Skunk Anansie
 2016 Astoria - Marianas Trench
 2016  Bad Vibrations - A Day to Remember
 2016  California - Blink-182 **Grammy Nominee
 2016  Distortland - The Dandy Warhols
 2016 DNA – Trapt
 2016 Dystopia - Megadeth
 2016 Have It All - Bethel Music
 2016 Hidden City - The Cult 
 2016  Hurricane - Nick Fradiani
 2016  If I'm the Devil - Letlive
 2016 Incarnate - Killswitch Engage
 2016 It's About Time - Hank Williams Jr. 
 2016  It's Not Over...The Hits So Far - Daughtry
 2016 Kentucky - Black Stone Cherry
 2016  Letters from the Labyrinth  - Trans-Siberian Orchestra
 2016 Limitless – Tonight Alive
 2016  Love Riot - Newsboys
 2016 Magma - Gojira **Grammy Nominee
 2016  Matière Noire - Mass Hysteria
 2016 Misadventures - Pierce the Veil
 2016  No Place in Heaven - Mika
 2016  Portrait - Cardiknox
 2016  Rita Wilson – Rita Wilson
 2016  Rocket Science - Rick Springfield
 2016  S.O.A.R. - Devour the Day
 2016  Santana IV – Santana
 2016 Sinner - Aaron Lewis
 2016  The Astonishing - Dream Theater
 2016  The Evil Divide - Death Angel
 2016  The Last Hero - Alter Bridge
 2016  To Be Everywhere Is to Be Nowhere - Thrice
 2016  Unleashed - Skillet
 2016  Us and the Night - 3 Doors Down
 2016  Wakrat – WAKRAT
 2016  War - She Is We
 2016  We Are the Ones - Dee Snider
 2016  What's Inside: Songs from Waitress - Sara Bareilles
 2016 Weezer - Weezer **Grammy Nomination
 2016 Yellowcard – Yellowcard
2016 Aggressive - Beartooth
2016 Bang, Zoom, Crazy... Hello - Cheap Trick
2016 Before Sunrise - Modern Space
2016 Capsule: 1999-2016 - The Faint
2016 Cold World - Of Mice & Men
2016 Don't You - Wet
2016 Dust - Tremonti
2016 Hometown Life - Sully Erna
2016 Into the Wild Live: Chicago - Halestorm
2016 Lifelines - I Prevail
2016 Lunar Prelude - Delain
2016 Moonbathers - Delain
2016 Road Less Traveled - Boyce Avenue
2016 The Loudspeaker EP - MUNA
2016 The Memories Uninvited - One Less Reason
2016 The Black Parade/Living with Ghosts - My Chemical Romance
2016 The Unity Sessions - Pat Metheny
2016 To Celebrate Christmas - Jennifer Nettles
2016 Transit Blues - The Devil Wears Prada
2016 WALLS - Kings of Leon
2016 Who You Selling For - The Pretty Reckless
2016 Wrong Crowd - Tom Odell
2016 Beginner 初学者 - Joker Xue 薛之谦
2016 Just Right 刚刚好 - Joker Xue 薛之谦
2017  A Girl, a Bottle, a Boat - Train
2017  Reanimate 3.0: The Covers EP - Halestorm
2017 A Place Where There's No More Pain - Life of Agony
2017 Silver Eye - Goldfrapp
2017 About U - MUNA
2017  Ambitions - One OK Rock
2017 Songs of Cinema - Michael Bolton
2017 Feed the Machine - Nickelback 
2017 Memphis... Yes, I'm Ready – Dee Dee Bridgewater
2017  3 Minutes to Midnight - Lawson Rollins
2017  Random - Charly Garcia
2017  Fail You Again - Can't Swim
2017  The Sick,Dumb and Happy - The Charm The Fury
2017  Residente - Residente *2017 Winner of a Latin Grammy for Album of the Year
2017  Believe - The String Cheese Incident
2017  Good Life Bad Liver - Justin Masters
2017  Cosas Vanas - Ciclo
2017  Dreamcar - Dreamcar
2017  Crooked Teeth - Papa Roach
2017  Fateless - Coldrain
2017  Sunrise - Day 6
2017  Last Young Renegade - All Time Low
2017  We're Alright - Cheap Trick
2017  Being as an Ocean - Being as an Ocean
2017  Focus - Jae Jung Parc
2017  Mis-An-Thrope - DED
2017  Om - Park Won
2017  Walk on Water - Thirty Seconds to Mars
2017  Gossip - Sleeping with Sirens
2017  Skin & Earth - Lights
2017  Asking Alexandria - Asking Alexandria
2017  Wake Up Call - Theory of a Deadman
2017  Hallelujah Here Below - Elevation Worship  **Grammy nominated
2017  Like The Wind 像风一样 - Joker Xue 薛之谦
2018  Vale - Black Veil Brides
2018  Collateral - Phillip Phillips
2018  Defy - Of Mice & Men
2018  Hallelujah Nights - Lanco
2018  Crooked Shadows - Dashboard Confessional
2018  Outsider - Three Days Grace
2018  Erase Me - Underoath
2018  Sound Doctrine - Naul
2018  When Legends Rise - Godsmack
2018  Ember - Breaking Benjamin
2018  Attention Attention - Shinedown
2018  Reverence - Parkway Drive
2018  Rollin' Stoned and Livin' Free - Them Evils
2018  Bigger - Sugarland
2018  A Dying Machine - Tremonti
2018  M/F - Matt Fishel
2018  Artificial Selection - Dance Gavin Dance
2018  Gravity - Bullet for My Valentine
2018  Killing Is My Business... and Business Is Good! - Megadeth
2018  Appetite for Destruction - Guns N' Roses
2018  Evolution - Disturbed
2018  Lemon - Kenshi Yonezu
2018 Various Artists – Muscle Shoals: Small Town, Big Sound
2018 Only Ticket Home - Gavin James
2018 Young and Dangerous - The Struts
2018 Jubilee Road - Tom Odell
2018  Hurry Up & Hang Around - Blues Traveler
2018 The Future - From Ashes to New
2018 Halftime - Karen Mok
2018 Vicious - Halestorm *Grammy Winner
2018 Disease - Beartooth
2018 Living the Dream - Slash (feat. Myles Kennedy & The Conspirators)
2018 Matzka Station - Matzka
2018 Pop Evil - Pop Evil
2018 Catharsis - Machine Head
2018 Be the Cowboy - Mitski
2019  Amo - Bring Me the Horizon
2019  The World Needs a Hero - Megadeth
2019  The System Has Failed - Megadeth
2019 Evolution - Kobra and the Lotus
2019 World War X - Carnifex
2019 Beauty of Youth - Pretty Vicious
2019 Wilder Woods - Wilder Woods
2019 Latenights and Longnecks - Justin Moore
2019 Freya Ridings - Freya Ridings
2019 Humanicide - Death Angel
2019 I, The Mask - In Flames
2019 Order in Decline - Sum 41
2019 Heartache Medication - Jon Pardi
2019 Victorius - Skillet
2019 State I'm In - Aaron Lewis
2019 No Saint - Lauren Jenkins
2019 Warheads on Foreheads - Megadeth
2019 Eye of the Storm - One Ok Rock
2019 You Are OK - The Maine
2019 Pop Talks - Judah and the Lion
2019 Trauma - I Prevail
2019 OK I'm Sick - Badflower
2019 Egowork - The Faint 
2019 Maniac - Mass Hysteria
2019 Twenty - Taking Back Sunday
2019 Magnolia - Randy Houser
2019 Who Do You Trust? - Papa Roach
2019 The Side Effects - Coldrain

2020s to present
2020 Decade - Fools Errant
2020 Si Vis Pacem, Para Bellum – Seether
2020 When You See Yourself -	Kings of Leon
2020	What the Dead Men Say- Trivium
2020	Wake Up, Sunshine -	All Time Low
2020	Viva the Underdogs -	Parkway Drive
2020	This Christmas	- Francesca Battistelli	
2020	The Speed of Now, Vol. 1- Keith Urban	
2020	The Kingdom -	Bush
2020	The Blessing [Live]	- Kari Jobe	
2020	The Best Ones of the Best Ones -	Dashboard Confessional
2020	The Atlantic Years 1984-1990 -	Ratt
2020	The Symbol Remains - Blue Öyster Cult	
2020	The Human Condition -	Black Stone Cherry	
2020	Songs of Recovery -	Darro
2020	Si Vis Pacem, Para Bellum -	Seether	
2020	Say Nothing -	Theory of a Deadman
2020	Rancho Fiesta Sessions	- Jon Pardi
2020	Odin's Raven Magic	Sigur Rós
2020	Next Girl -	Carly Pearce
2020	New Empire, Vol. 2 -	Hollywood Undead
2020	Mettavolution [Live] -	Rodrigo y Gabriela
2020	Medium Rarities -	Mastodon
2020	McGraw Machine Hits: 2013-2019	- Tim McGraw	
2020	MONOMANIA -	The Word Alive	
2020	Lamb of God	- Lamb of God
2020	If It Wasn't for You - Caylee Hammack
2020	I Hurt You, I Made This	- Brother Sundance
2020	God, Family, Country -	Craig Morgan
2020	Getting Good -	Lauren Alaina
2020	From This Place -	Pat Metheny
2020	DC Talk Collection - 	dc Talk	
2020	Co-Starring	 - Ray Wylie Hubbard
2020	Bad Trick - Ray Wylie Hubbard
2020	Aurora	 - Breaking Benjamin	
2020	American Standard -	James Taylor
2020	Amends -	Grey Daze
2020	All Distortions Are Intentional	- Neck Deep
2020	Ain't Looking Back -	Mo Pitney
2020	Acting My Age - The Academic / Cid Rim
2021	Should’ve Known Better- 	Carly Pearce
2021	Overcast - 	Almora Down
2021	Earth Is a Black Hole - Teenage Wrist
2021	Death by Rock and Roll	- The Pretty Reckless
2021	Dangerous: The Double Album - 	Morgan Wallen
2021	29 - 	Carly Pearce
2021	Where Have You Gone - Alan Jackson	
2021	When You See Yourself -	Kings of Leon
2021	The Campfire - Needtobreathe
2021	The Sunday EP - Needtobreathe
2021	The Bitter Truth - Evanescence	
2021	Surface Sounds	- KALEO
2021	Straight Outta the Country - Justin Moore
2021	Reveries - Styx	
2021	Real to Me	- Callista Clark
2021	Paranoia - Maggie Lindemann
2021	Nowhere Generation - Rise Against
2021	Magnetic - Newsboys	
2021	Love Songs - Take That	
2021	Lazy Love Songs	- Guster	
2021	In Another World - Cheap Trick	
2021	Fortitude - Gojira	
2021	Encounter - Kari Jobe
2021	Crash of the Crown - Styx
2021	Blue Weekend -	Wolf Alice
2021	Best Country Valentine's Day -	various
2021   The Ironic Divide - Aziola Cry
2021   Best Thing Since Backroads - Jake Owen
2021  Dear Miss Loretta - Carly Pierce 
2021  Don't Hate Me - Badflower
2021  Absurd - Guns N' Roses
2021  Stubborn Pride/Paradise Lost on Me - Zac Brown Band
2021  In the Court of the Dragon - Trivium
2021  Brushed - Quicksand
2021  Rambler - Bones Owens
2021  What's Coming to Me - Dorothy
2021  Kids - Sam Williams
2021  Songs of Loss and Separation - Times of Grace
2021  Girl Who Didn't Care - Tenille Townes
2021  White Buffalo - Crown Lands
2021  Tattoo - Girlfriends
2021  Family - Badflower
2021  Tequila Does - Miranda Lambert
2021  Only Us - Clayton Anderson
2021  Text You Back - Brother Sundance
2021  I am Nothing - Kat Von D
2021  Same Boat - Zac Brown Band
2021  American Rust - Ernest
2021  Nowhere Generation - Rise Against
2021  Chemical Warfare - Escape the Fate
2021  Godzilla - The Veronicas
2021  Bite Marks - AU/RA
2021  Child of the State - Ayron Jones 
2021  Remind Me of You - Lily Rose
2021  Choke - The Warning
2021  Blurry - Hardy
2021  Help Me to Feel Again - Judah and the Lion
2021  Take Your Time - Ayron Jones
2022	You Proof - Morgan Wallen	
2022	Water to Drink Not Write About - Florence + the Machine
2022	Voyeurist - Underoath
2022	Til My Last Day: The Love Songs	- Justin Moore
2022	Thought You Should Know- Morgan Wallen
2022	The Tipping Point- Tears for Fears
2022	Still Dreamin''' - Tomoyasu Hotei
2022   Consilience- Libricide	
2022	Stereotype - Cole Swindell	
2022	Scoring the End of the World - Motionless in White	
2022	ROX RMX, Vol. 2	- Roxette
2022	Planet Zero - Shinedown
2022	Nowhere Generation II - Rise Against
2022	My Favorite Ghosts - Florence + the Machine
2022	Live at the Roxy - The Tragically Hip
2022	Laurel Hell	- Mitski
2022	"Last Night Lonely" - Jon Pardi
2022	Lalalalovesongs - Jason Mraz
2022	In Our Own Sweet Time - Vance Joy
2022	In Between: The Collection- Danielle Bradbery
2022	Impera - Ghost
2022	Hunter's Moon - Ghost
2022	Harder Than It Looks - Simple Plan
2022	Harder Than Hell - Florence + the Machine
2022	Growin' Up - Luke Combs
2022	Gifts from the Holy Ghost - DOROTHY
2022	Frayed at Both Ends - Aaron Lewis
2022	Don't Think Jesus - Morgan Wallen
2022	Dominion - Skillet
2022	Crisis of Faith- Billy Talent
2022	Co-Starring Too	- Ray Wylie Hubbard
2022	Back from the Dead - Halestorm
2022	A Tribute to Led Zeppelin - Beth Hart
2022	1972 - T. Rex	(Remastering)
2022	4 - Slash
2022	Luxury Disease - One Ok Rock
2022	The Sick, the Dying... and the Dead! - Megadeth
2022   True Power - I Prevail
2023   Lighting Up the Sky - Godsmack

5.1 Surround sound

1997 Imaginary Day - Pat Metheny
1997 Hourglass - James Taylor
2001 Hotel California - Eagles
2001 Stiff Upper Lip Live - AC/DC
2005 Disasterpieces - Slipknot (Quadruple Platinum)
2005 Brick - Talking Heads
2006 True Stories - Talking Heads
2006 Remain in Light - Talking Heads
2006 Naked - Talking Heads
2006 Talking Heads: 77 - Talking Heads
2006 More Songs About Buildings and Food - Talking Heads
2006 Little Creatures - Talking Heads
2006 Fear of Music - Talking Heads
2006 Speaking in Tongues - Talking Heads
2008 Metallica - Metallica
2013 Live at Rome Olympic Stadium - Muse 
2013 The Truth About Love - Pink

Catalog remastering/box sets
 The Beatles (The Capitol Albums), 
 Billy Joel - The Stranger 30th Anniversary Edition, My Lives 
 Eagles
 Joe Walsh
 AC/DC
 Bob Marley
 James Brown
 Cat Stevens
 Kings of Leon
 The Complete Roadrunner Collection 
 Fear Factory
 Madonna
 Aretha Franklin
 Paul Simon
 Keith Richards – The Only Offender US Box Set
 Duran Duran
 The Cars - The Cars , Candy-O , Panorama , Shake It Up , Heartbeat City , Door To Door , Best Of Guns N' Roses - Locked 'N Loaded **Grammy Nomination
 Luna Sea

Motion picture soundtracks/Broadway shows

2020	Promising Young Woman [Original Motion Picture Soundtrack]	
2017 The Shack: Music From and Inspired by the Original Motion Picture - Various Artists
 2016  Captain Fantastic Soundtrack - Alex Somers
 2016 School of Rock - The Musical (Original Cast Recording)
 2016 Waitress - (Original Cast Recording)
 2014  Unbroken - Alexandre Desplat
 2014  Jersey Boys: Music from the Motion Picture and Broadway Musical - Bob Gaudio, Bob Crewe
 2012  Newsies - Newsies - Alan Menken
 2007	Silk [Original Motion Picture Soundtrack] - Ryuichi Sakamoto
 2007	Transformers: The Movie [2007 Live Action]
 2006  Over the Hedge [Original Motion Picture Soundtrack] - Rupert Gregson-Williams
 2005	Jersey Boys [Original Broadway Cast Recording] - Bob Gaudio, Bob Crewe
 2005	Disney's On the Record [Original Cast Recording]
 2005	Monty Python's Spamalot [Original Broadway Cast Recording]
 2005	Rent [Selections from the Original Motion Picture Soundtrack]
 2005	Robots [Original Soundtrack]
 2005	The Chumscrubber [Original Motion Picture Score] - James Horner
 2004	Taboo [Original Broadway Cast] - Boy George, Kevan Frost, John Themis. Richie Stevens
 2004  Shall We Dance? - Music From The Motion Picture
 2004  Bride and Prejudice [Original Soundtrack]
 2003  Daredevil: "Bring Me To Life" , "My Immortal" - Varèse Sarabande
 2003  How to Deal [Original Soundtrack]
 2003	Freddy vs. Jason [Original Soundtrack] - Graeme Revell, Machine Head
 2003	Wicked: A New Musical [Original Broadway Cast Recording] - Stephen Schwartz
 2002	Treasure Planet [Original Motion Picture Score]	James Newton Howard
 2002	Femme Fatale (Original Soundtrack) - Ryuichi Sakamoto
 2000  Aida (Original Broadway Cast Recording) - Elton John And Tim Rice* 1999	Annie Get Your Gun [1999 Broadway Revival Cast]
 1999  Man on the Moon [Original Soundtrack]
 1999	Jawbreaker [Original Soundtrack] - Stephen Endelman
 1999	eXistenZ [Music from the Motion Picture] - Howard Shore
 1998	Child's Play 4 
 1998	Snake Eyes [Music from the Motion Picture] - Ryuichi Sakamoto
 1997	Crash [Original Motion Picture Soundtrack]	Howard Shore
 1997	West Side Story -	Dave Grusin
 1996	Before and After [Music from the Original Motion Picture Soundtrack]	Howard Shore
 1996	Big [Original Broadway Cast] - 
 1995  Dumb and Dumber - Todd Rundgren
 1995  Cure [Original Soundtrack] - Dave Grusin
 1994  Corrina Corrina [Original Soundtrack] - Rick Cox
 1994  Ed Wood [Original Soundtrack] - Howard Shore
 1994  Passion [Original Broadway Cast Recording] Original Broadway Cast - Stephen Sondheim and James Lapine
 1994  The Client [Original Score] - Howard Shore	
 1993  Philadelphia - Jonathan Demme
 1993  The Goodbye Girl [Broadway Cast] - Dave Grusin
 1993  The Firm - Dave Grusin
 1993  Teenage Mutant Ninja Turtles III - Original Motion Picture Soundtrack - Pete Ganbarg
 1993  Mrs. Doubtfire [Original Soundtrack Album] - Howard Shore
 1992  Reality Bites: Original Motion Picture Soundtrack
 1992  Rush [Original Score] - Eric Clapton
 1992  Twin Peaks - Fire Walk With Me (Music From The Motion Picture Soundtrack)
 1992  White Men Can't Jump (Original Motion Picture Soundtrack)
 1992  White Men Can't Rap (More Music From The Twentieth Century Fox Film White Men Can't Jump) 
 1991  Teenage Mutant Ninja Turtles II: The Secret of the Ooze (The Original Motion Picture Soundtrack)
 1987  Hearts of Fire - Original Motion Picture Soundtrack
 1986  She's Gotta Have It - Original Motion Picture Soundtrack - Bill Lee
 1982  Little Shop of Horrors Cast Album - Howard Ashman & Alan Menken
 1982  On Golden Pond'' Music From The Motion Picture Soundtrack  - Dave Grusin

Television and video documentaries
2014 Destiny (Halo franchise video game) - Score by Paul McCartney featuring "Hope for the Future"
2012 SUM 41: Blood in My Eyes (Video short)
2011 Sigur Rós: Inni (Documentary)
2010 Go Quiet Jonsi
 2006	The Videos: 1989-2004 [Video]	Metallica
 2006	MTV Unplugged [DVD]	Ricky Martin
2005 Green Day: Bullet in a Bible (Video documentary)

2005 A Supernatural Evening with Carlos Santana (TV Special)
2004	Worship at Red Rocks [DVD]	John Tesh
2004 Live from the Eye of the Storm (Video short) (surround sound)
2004 Xenosaga Episode II: Jenseits von Gut und Böse (Video Game)
2003 Pearl Jam: Live at the Garden (Video documentary)
2002 Nickelback: Live at Home (Video documentary) (surround)
2002 Disasterpieces
2001 AC/DC: Stiff Upper Lip Live (Video documentary) (surround mixing)
2001 Pearl Jam: Touring Band 2000 (Video documentary)
1999 Madonna: The Video Collection 93:99
1999 SNL: 25 Years of Music
 1999 VH1 Storytellers - Meat Loaf
1987 Moonlighting The Television Soundtrack Album

References

Discographies of American artists